Zavaleta or Zabaleta is a surname of Basque origin. The Basques are a people indigenous to areas of northern Spain and southern France, an historical region known as the Basque Country.

Origin and meaning 
Zavaleta (Zabaleta) includes a lexeme ("zabal", 'small square / courtyard' as a noun, according to linguist specialist Koldo Mitxelena) and a suffix ("eta", suffix expressing 'abundance').

Zavaleta vs. Zabaleta 
The surname Zabaleta is created in the Basque language by combining the root, Zabal, with the suffix, eta, hence Zabal-eta. The surname Zabaleta was changed in the Spanish Empire in the Americas to the Spanish or Castellano variant, where the "b" is changed to a "v", hence Zavaleta. The two spellings are interchangeable and represent one single family worldwide. Today, Zavaleta families have usually lived in the Americas for generations, while Zabaletas are in Spain (or more recent arrivals in the Americas).

Notable people 
Brian Zabaleta, Argentine footballer
Cara Zavaleta, Model and Reality Star
Erika Zavaleta, American ecologist and evolutionary biologist
Eriq Zavaleta, American footballer
Jorge Zabaleta, Chilean actor
La Zavaleta, Mexican drag queen
Mariano Zabaleta, Argentine tennis player
Marta Zabaleta, Argentine-British author
Miguel Zavaleta, Argentinian rock musician
Nicanor Zabaleta, Spanish harpist
Pablo Zabaleta, Argentine footballer
Ramón Zavaleta, Peruvian cyclist
René Zavaleta Mercado, Bolivian politician, sociologist and philosopher
Susana Zabaleta, Mexican singer and actress
Ruth Zavaleta, Mexican politician

References

Basque-language surnames